Spring Hill Farm may refer to:

Places
in the United States
(by state)
 Spring Hill Farm and Stock Ranch House, Strong City, Kansas, listed on the National Register of Historic Places (NRHP)
 Spring Hill Farm (Lexington, Kentucky), listed on the NRHP in Fayette County, Kentucky
 Spring Hill Farm (Ellicott City, Maryland), a historic plantation
 Spring Hill Farm (Lebanon, New Hampshire), NRHP-listed
 Spring Hill Farm (Hamilton, Virginia), NRHP-listed
 Spring Hill Farm (McLean, Virginia), NRHP-listed

Other uses
 Spring Hill Farm, nom de course for the Thoroughbred racing stable of James D. Norris